Daniel Lønborg Thøgersen (born 8 January 2000) is a Danish footballer who plays for Danish 2nd Division club Esbjerg fB.

Career

Club career
Thøgersen started his career at the age of 7 at Brabrand IF, where his father was the coach. At the age of 12, in 2012, Thøgersen joined AGF. He developed well and was one of the stars of the youth sector, which was rewarded with a youth contract in November 2015.

In the summer 2017, Thøgersen was permanently promoted into the first team squad and also signed a new three-year professional contract. He got his official debut for the club on 29 August 2017 against VSK Aarhus in the Danish Cup, where he played the whole game.

On 2 September 2019, the last day of the summer transfer market, Thøgersen was loaned out to Danish 1st Division club Næstved BK for the rest of 2019 to gain some first team minutes, after having only played six games for AGF. On 9 December 2019 it was confirmed, that Thøgersen had been loaned out again, this time to Kolding IF for the rest of the season. In July 2020, Thøgersen was signed permanently by Kolding.

On 15 June 2021, Thøgersen signed a 2,5-year contract with Danish 1st Division club HB Køge. After a year at Køge, Thøgersen left the club to join newly relegated Danish 2nd Division club Esbjerg fB, signing a deal for the rest of the year on 26 August 2022.

Career statistics

References

External links
Daniel Thøgersen at DBU

Danish men's footballers
2000 births
Living people
People from Esbjerg
Association football fullbacks
Denmark youth international footballers
Danish Superliga players
Danish 1st Division players
Danish 2nd Division players
Aarhus Gymnastikforening players
Næstved Boldklub players
Kolding IF players
Brabrand IF players
HB Køge players
Esbjerg fB players
Sportspeople from the Region of Southern Denmark